Worms W.M.D is a 2D artillery turn-based tactics video game in the Worms series, released on 23 August 2016. Its gameplay resembles that of Worms Armageddon more than subsequent installments, while adding new features that range from interactive vehicles such as tanks, to buildings that the worms can enter for protection. It is also notable for being the first major redesign the worm characters have received since Worms 3D.

Gameplay

Worms W.M.D aims to replicate the gameplay of Worms Armageddon, with graphics and game design returned to a 2D interface. Gameplay elements from previous installments, such as classes, water physics and dynamic objects, are removed. A new feature includes the ability to craft weapons by gathering parts from special crates or by disassembling weapons. New weapons and utilities are added, such as a phone battery and a bazooka that creates fiery explosions; classic weapons such as the Holy Hand Grenade return as well. Also returning from Worms Forts: Under Siege are buildings that the worms can enter to a tactical advantage. Worms can make use of these buildings as a cover from enemy fire or to launch a surprise attack on enemy worms.

For the first time, vehicles and stationary turrets are introduced, which can alter gameplay in many ways. Worms can enter vehicles such as tanks, helicopters and Mechs that are available from the start or can be spawned by airdrops. Stationary guns, such as machine gun, mortar, flamethrower, and sniper rifle, can be used for greater damage within the line of sight. Both vehicles and turrets can take damage and become unusable if they take too much damage, after which they are destroyed.

The worms are separated in teams. Players are given the freedom to choose whether to use any preset team available or make a new team of their own. The worms in each team dress differently and have different graves to help tell them apart, as well as color codes. Each worm within a team has a name that has something to do with the team name.

Release
Worms W.M.D was released on PlayStation 4, Xbox One, Microsoft Windows and macOS on 23 August 2016.

All-Stars
On 12 July 2016, as a pre-order bonus, Team17 announced an expansion pack called Worms W.M.D All-Stars, featuring additional content themed after various other video games, such as the Octane Battle Car from Rocket League, several masks for worm customisation, various thematic weapons and additional missions. On 15 November 2016, All-Stars was released for free to all players.

Nintendo Switch
Following the August 2017 Nindies Showcase presentation, Team17 has confirmed Worms W.M.D for the Nintendo Switch. The game released digitally on the Nintendo Switch eShop on 23 November 2017 worldwide. Team17 initially partnered with Sold Out Sales & Marketing in November 2017 to release physical retail copies by 2018. However, in February 2018, Team17 then cancelled their plans for a physical release. UK publisher Super Rare Games issued a limited physical retail release for the Nintendo Switch in October 2018.

Reception

Worms W.M.D received "generally positive" reviews, according to video game review aggregator Metacritic. GameSpot rated the game 8 out of 10 and said "The relatively simple gameplay is overflowing with finesse and strategy, the presentation is fantastic, and offline or on, Worms is just incredibly fun." IGN praised the new crafting system but took issue with the buildings element, saying it was hard to discern which buildings could be entered and where their entrance points were.

Game Rant praised the new additions to the gameplay and called it "the game Worms fans have been waiting for since Worms Armageddon." DarkZero gave the Nintendo Switch version of the game 8 out of 10 praising its good selection of offline missions and rewarding training.

References

External links

2016 video games
Artillery video games
Crossover video games
Multiplayer video games
Nintendo Switch games
PlayStation 4 games
Strategy video games
Video games developed in the United Kingdom
Windows games
Worms games
Xbox Cloud Gaming games
Xbox One games
Video games with Steam Workshop support